The LSWR 318 class (also known as 'Plymouth' or 'Metropolitan' tanks) was a class of six passenger  tank locomotives supplied by Beyer, Peacock and Company in 1875 for the newly completed Exeter-Plymouth line. They proved to be unsuited to the task for which they were purchased, but were found alternative employments elsewhere on the system.

Background
The completion of the London and South Western Railway line between Exeter and Plymouth was going to require the provision of new passenger locomotives. William George Beattie approached Beyer, Peacock and Company of Openshaw near Manchester for the costs of six  well tank locomotives in 1873. The locomotive builders were unhappy with the design submitted to them and suggested rather their existing design of 4-4-0 side tank locomotives, which had performed well on the Metropolitan Railway. The proposal was accepted and the locomotives were delivered during January and February 1875.

Design differences
The LSWR locomotives did not have the condensing apparatus fitted to the original locomotives and they had metal awnings over the cabs. This created problems when coaling since the coal bunker was situated within the footplate area.

Stability problems
They proved to be unstable at higher speeds, even dangerous, it was suggested, leading to tests being made in 1877 on two locomotives, one fitted with a bogie designed by William Adams, before he joined the LSWR and one with a Crewe-type Bissel truck. The improvements achieved were insufficient to justify fitting new bogies on the remainder of the class. Beattie was censured by the Board of Directors when it became known that he had been aware of the rough riding of the class since 1875. Ultimately the class was transferred to the Epsom and Leatherhead services where they performed well at the lower speeds required of them. Adams later made minor adjustments to the bogies, which enabled the class to have more than thirty year careers on a variety of different services. They were all withdrawn between 1906 and 1913.

References

318
4-4-0 locomotives
Beyer, Peacock locomotives
Railway locomotives introduced in 1875
Scrapped locomotives
Standard gauge steam locomotives of Great Britain